Goliath is a steel roller coaster located at the Walibi Holland theme park in Biddinghuizen, Dronten in the Netherlands. It was described as "the fastest, highest and longest coaster in the Benelux", since 2021 both these records belong to Kondaa in Walibi Belgium. The train travels at speeds of up to  along  of track.

Ride information
The roller coaster is another collaboration of Swiss manufacturer Intamin and German engineer Werner Stengel. It employs similar lift hill technology as Expedition GeForce, utilizing a cable lift. The ride premiered in the 2002 season.

Ride layout
After climbing out of the station, the train is released from the catch car at the top of the lift hill and accelerates down the  first drop and runs over a large hill. After dropping for the second time, it ascends a hill called a Stengel Dive, the top being overbanked to around 100° to the right, before dropping down into a 270° downward helix. After medium-sized curved hill, it negotiates a 380° upwards helix and a bend to take the track parallel to the lift hill. Before entering the brake run, riders experience considerable air-time on three bunny hops.

Trains
Goliath has two trains with eight cars each. Each car seats two across in two rows. The trains are made of steel and have stadium-style seating. Restraints are hydraulic lap-bars.

Gallery

References

External links
 Walibi Holland website
 Attraction webpage (English Translation)

Roller coasters in the Netherlands
Roller coasters introduced in 2002
Walibi Holland
2002 establishments in the Netherlands
21st-century architecture in the Netherlands